Wehshi is an Urdu novel by Pakistani author Razia Butt. The novel revolves around the dysfunctional relation of a son with his mother and stepfather. The novel has been adapted into a film in 1972 and aTV series in 2022.

Synopsis
The novel talks about the effects of the childhood deprivations, abuse and toxic environment on one's life. It is about a young boy and his traumatised life who becomes so when his mother marries for second time after his father's death. His stepfather too tortures him mentally leading him to worse.

Adaptation 
 The novel was adpated into a film Pyasa (1972) which was directed by Hassan Tariq.
 Wehshi, a television series based on the novel, directed by Iqbal Hussain is currently airing on Hum TV.

References 

 
Pakistani novels adapted into films
Urdu-language novels
Urdu-language literature
20th-century Pakistani novels